Budweiser Budvar is a brewery in the Czech city of České Budějovice, best known for its original Budweiser or Budweiser Budvar pale lager brewed using artesian water, Moravian barley and Saaz hops. Budweiser Budvar is the fourth largest beer producer in the Czech Republic and the second largest exporter of beer abroad.

The state-owned brewery and its Budweiser pale lager have been engaged in a trademark dispute with Anheuser-Busch over the right to market and sell the beer under the name Budweiser since the start of the 20th century, and consequently is imported as Czechvar in some countries. The brewery is incorporated as Budějovický Budvar, národní podnik ("Budweiser Budvar, national enterprise").

History

1265–1895 
The history of brewing in České Budějovice dates back to 1265, when Ottokar II, King of Bohemia, granted the city brewing rights. At one point, the city was the imperial brewery of the Holy Roman Empire. To promote the quality of the drink, nearby towns were forbidden from brewing. To distinguish Budweis beer from that coming from other regions, it was called Budweiser Bier ("beer from Budweis" in German). By early 16th century, the Czech brewing industry was providing up to 87% of the total revenue for municipalities. The Thirty Years' War between 1618 and 1648, however, devastated much of Central Europe and with it, the Czech beer industry. Concurrently, the Kingdom of Bohemia became a part of the Habsburg monarchy after the war.

A separate brewery, Budweiser Bürgerbräu was founded in 1795 by the city's German-speaking citizens and started brewing Budweiser Bier in 1802. The company began shipping its beer to the United States in 1875. A year after, Adolphus Busch, a German immigrant to the United States and a businessman, encountered the brewery's Budweiser often during his visit to Europe. Thus, he decided to name his own beer Budweiser and brew it according to the Bohemian process. Budweiser Bürgerbräu was acquired by Anheuser-Busch InBev in 2014 to aid its claim on the Budweiser trademark.

1895–present 
Budweiser Budvar Brewery was incorporated in 1895 as the Czech Joint Stock Brewery when local Czech breweries in České Budějovice, then part of Austria-Hungary, merged and started brewing Budweiser with new technology. The name Budvar is a portmanteau of Budějovice Pivovar 'Budweis Brewery'. With the German occupation of Czechoslovakia during World War II and its communist-rule during the Cold War, the brewery was unable to compete with the American Anheuser-Busch as production faltered. By 1948, all Czech breweries had been nationalized by the communist government.

The brewery reported in 2015 that it had grown by 226% since 1991 and that its total sales volume had increased by 39% in the last ten years.

Budweiser Budvar

Production 
Budweiser Budvar beer is produced in the brewery at České Budějovice, drawing artesian water from wells beneath it, with Moravian barley and Saaz hops, known as a noble hop variety, from the Žatec region. It is matured for a minimum of 90 days, contrasted with 72 hours of lagering (maturation) for mass-market beers. In 2004, the European Union awarded Budweiser Budvar Protected Geographical Indication status. Budweiser is the brewery's "signature product" and a "symbol of national pride". The drinks reviewer Michael Jackson said the following of the company's lager in 2002:Budweiser Budvar is a great beer because it has great raw materials and great brewers. They produce it in a slow and painstaking way. Its integrity is best served by its being produced in its town of origin, in a region with pride in its beer. In 1990, the company brewed 450,000 hectolitres of beer a year and exported to 18 countries; in 2013, 1.42 million hectolitres and 66 countries; and in 2015, 1.6 million hectolitres and 76 countries, respectively. It is the most bought foreign beer in Germany, selling approximately 290,000 hectolitres in 2016, and the best selling Czech beer in the United Kingdom.

Trademark dispute 

Budweiser Budvar Brewery and the American brewery Anheuser-Busch have been engaged in an ongoing trademark dispute over the name Budweiser since the start of the 20th century. In 1939, only one week before the German occupation of Czechoslovakia, Budweiser Budvar agreed to concede exclusive rights to the American brewery in the United States area. During World War II and the Cold War, Budweiser Budvar was unable to compete with then independent Anheuser-Busch. In 1994, then CEO of Budweiser Budvar Jiří Boček decided not to sign a trademark agreement with the American brewery to divide their territory across the world. On 29 July 2010, Anheuser-Busch lost its last-instance appeal in the European Court of Justice, meaning it may not register the name Budweiser as a European Union trademark for beer.

Consequently Budweiser Budvar beer is imported as "Czechvar" in Brazil, Canada, Mexico, Panama, Peru, Philippines and the United States and Anheuser-Busch sells its beer as "Bud" in most of the European Union.

Beers 

The company brews different types of lager:
 Classic, a pale draught beer with 4.0% ABV (in Czech: 10° or Výčepní).
 Original, 90-day matured pale lager and flagship of the brand, marketed as a premium lager, contains 5.0% ABV (in Czech: 12° or Ležák). 
 Dark, a dark lager with Munich, caramel and roasted malt and 4.7% ABV (in Czech: Tmavé). 
 Special, the original pale lager with added cultures of yeast and 5.0% ABV (in Czech: Kroužkovaný ležák).
 Cvikl, an unfiltered yeast pale lager with 4.0% ABV (in Czech: Nefiltrované).
 Strong, a strong pale lager matured for 200 days, contains 7.5% ABV (in Czech: 16° or Speciál).
 Free, a low-alcohol beer with 0.5% ABV (in Czech: Nealkoholické). 
 Cryo, an eisbock with 21% ABV (in Czech: Mražený speciál).
Additionally, Budweiser Budvar brewery produces beer under the Pardál brand.
 Pardál, a pale draught beer with 3.8% ABV.
 Pardál Echt, a pale lager with 4.5% ABV.
 Pardál Echt kvasnicový, an unfiltered yeast beer with 4.5% ABV.
 Pardálovo Bezové, an elderberry beer with 2,0% ABV.

List of brewmasters 
The following is a list of Budweiser Budvar Brewery's brewmasters:
 Antonín Holeček, 1.4.1895–31.3.1899
 František Felix, 1.4.1899-31.12.1908
 Josef Brych, 1.1.1909–26.2.1919
 Vladimír Kořán, 1.3.1919-31.12.1935
 Oldřich Miškovský, 1.1.1936–30.4.1942
 Václav Rambousek, 1.5.1942–10.4.1948
 Rudolf Smolík, 1.1.1949–31.7.1959
 Miloš Heide, 1.8.1959–31.12.1984
 Josef Tolar, 1.1.1985–31.12.2008
 Adam Brož, 1.1.2009–present

See also 

 Beer in the Czech Republic
 Pilsner

References

Further reading

External links
 
 Official website of Czechvar

Products with protected designation of origin
Budejovicky Budvar
Beer brands of the Czech Republic
Food and drink companies established in 1895
1895 establishments in Austria-Hungary
19th-century establishments in Bohemia
České Budějovice